Paul John Wiseman (born 4 May 1970) is a former New Zealand cricketer.  "Wiz", as he was nicknamed, was an off spinner who took 9–13 for Canterbury against Central Districts in Christchurch to record the second best figures for a New Zealand bowler. Internationally, however, he was unable to forge a significant career due to the incumbency of first-choice spinner Daniel Vettori.

Domestic career
Wiseman spent a year as a professional with the Central Lancashire Cricket League side Milnrow in 2005 and made connections with English county cricket Durham in 2006 whilst playing for Walkden in the Bolton Cricket League, playing four games for their second XI before making his debut against Lancashire in the penultimate Championship game of the 2006 season. He was also signed for the following 2 seasons, however at the end of 2009 – after being overlooked through most of the season with Ian Blackwell and Gareth Breese fighting it out for the spinners berth – he retired from all first class cricket at the age of 39.

International career
On his Test Match debut, he took five wickets in the second innings against Sri Lanka in Colombo in 1998.

After cricket
Wiseman returned to New Zealand taking up the position of Network Coach for Canterbury Cricket in October 2009. He led both the Canterbury Under 17 and Under 19 teams to wins at their National tournaments in the 2009/10 season.

Wiseman is the coach of the New Zealand national under-19 cricket team for the 2020 Under-19 Cricket World Cup in South Africa.

See also
 List of New Zealand cricketers who have taken five-wicket hauls on Test debut

References

1970 births
Living people
Auckland cricketers
Canterbury cricketers
Durham cricketers
New Zealand One Day International cricketers
New Zealand Test cricketers
New Zealand cricketers
Otago cricketers
Cricketers at the 1998 Commonwealth Games
Commonwealth Games bronze medallists for New Zealand
Cricketers who have taken five wickets on Test debut
Commonwealth Games medallists in cricket
South Island cricketers
Medallists at the 1998 Commonwealth Games